Benjamin Ambrosio Oglivie Palmer (born February 11, 1949) is a Panamanian former professional baseball left fielder, who played in Major League Baseball (MLB) for the Boston Red Sox (1971–1973), Detroit Tigers (1974–1977), and Milwaukee Brewers (1978–1986). He also played two seasons in Nippon Professional Baseball (NPB) for the Kintetsu Buffaloes (1987–1988). Oglivie batted and threw left-handed.

Oglivie made his MLB debut on September 4, 1971, for the Red Sox and played his final big league game on October 5, 1986, for the Brewers. He hit for power fairly well, breaking the 40-home run mark in 1980 with 41, which was good for a tie (with Reggie Jackson) for the American League (AL) lead. Oglivie hit three home runs in a game three times. In the process, he became the first non-U.S. born player to lead the AL in home runs. He also finished second in the AL with 118 RBIs and 333 total bases.

Oglivie batted .241 with eight homers and 30 runs batted in (RBI) and led the Red Sox in pinch hitting with a .375 average in his first full MLB season in 1972. After slumping to .218 with two homers in 58 games, he was traded from the Red Sox to the Tigers for Dick McAuliffe on October 23, 1973. Oglivie was acquired by the Brewers from the Tigers for Jim Slaton and Rich Folkers at the Winter Meetings on December 9, 1977.

In a 16-year Major League career, Oglivie posted a .273 batting average, with 277 doubles, 560 bases on balls, 235 home runs and 901 runs batted in (RBI), in 1,754 games. He had 87 career stolen bases and 784 runs scored. Oglivie picked up 1,615 hits in 5,913 at bats.

Continuing his pro career in Japanese baseball (NPB), Oglivie played for the Kintetsu Buffaloes, powering 46 home runs in two seasons in 1987 and 1988. He then returned to attempt a comeback in American minor league baseball (MiLB); although Oglivie posted great offensive numbers in only two Double-A games, it proved to be the end of his pro baseball playing journey.

Oglivie has coached at various levels for a number of different organizations, including Milwaukee, Pittsburgh, San Diego, Tampa Bay, and Detroit. In 2000, he joined the Padres’ MLB staff for one season.

The Colón, Panama, native was one of six post-1959 players selected as part of the 2012 class inducted in the Latino Baseball Hall of Fame. Each Latin-American country (Puerto Rico, Cuba, Dominican Republic, Mexico, and Venezuela) had one player chosen for enshrinement, which took place in February 2012.

See also

 List of Major League Baseball career home run leaders
 List of Major League Baseball annual home run leaders

References

External links

Ben Oglivie at SABR (Baseball BioProject)
Ben Oglivie at Pura Pelota (Venezuelan Professional Baseball League)

1949 births
Living people
Águilas del Zulia players
Panamanian expatriate baseball players in Venezuela
American League All-Stars
American League home run champions
Boston Red Sox players
Detroit Tigers players
Kintetsu Buffaloes players
Major League Baseball left fielders
Major League Baseball players from Panama
Milwaukee Brewers players
Panamanian expatriate baseball players in Japan
Panamanian expatriate baseball players in the United States
Sportspeople from Colón, Panama
Silver Slugger Award winners
Winter Haven Red Sox players
El Paso Diablos players
Florida Instructional League Red Sox players
Greenville Red Sox players
Jamestown Falcons players
Louisville Colonels (minor league) players
Pawtucket Red Sox players